Patrick John Dickinson (28 August 1919 – 28 May 1984) was an English first-class cricketer active from 1939 to 1953 who played for Surrey. He was born in India, and died in St Pancras, London.

He was educated at King's College School, Wimbledon, and went up to St John's College, Cambridge, in autumn 1938.

References

1919 births
1984 deaths
English cricketers
Surrey cricketers
Cambridge University cricketers
People educated at King's College School, London
Alumni of St John's College, Cambridge